The Sphinx (Italian:La sfinge) is a 1920 Italian silent film directed by Roberto Roberti and starring Francesca Bertini.

Plot summary

Cast
 Alberto Albertini 
 Francesca Bertini 
 Giuseppe Farnesi 
 Elena Lunda 
 Mario Parpagnoli
 Augusto Poggioli

References

Bibliography
 Cristina Jandelli. Le dive italiane del cinema muto. L'epos, 2006.

External links
 

1920 films
1920s Italian-language films
Films directed by Roberto Roberti
Italian silent feature films
Italian black-and-white films